Jeremy Spenser (born Jeremy John Dornhurst de Saram 16 July 1937) is a British actor who made his screen debut aged 11 in Anna Karenina (1948).

The following year he played in the black comedy Kind Hearts and Coronets as the young Louis Mazzini. He played the young King Nicolas in The Prince and the Showgirl with Laurence Olivier and Marilyn Monroe and in Ferry to Hong Kong with Orson Welles.

In the 1960s, the role offers began to slow down. His last film role was in 1966's Fahrenheit 451 directed by François Truffaut. A little later Spenser retired from acting.

Personal life
Jeremy Spenser is the brother of British actor, director, producer and writer David Spenser.

Selected filmography

 Anna Karenina (1948) - Giuseppe
 Kind Hearts and Coronets (1949) - Young Louis (uncredited)
 The Spider and the Fly (1949) - Jacques, boy in church
 Prelude to Fame (1950) - Guido Ferugia
 The Dancing Years (1950) - Maria's Son
 Portrait of Clare (1950) - Steven Hingston
 Appointment with Venus (1951) - Georges
 The Planter's Wife (1952) - Mat
 Background (1953) - Adrian Lomax
 Devil on Horseback (1954) - Moppy Parfitt
 The Man Who Loved Redheads (1955) - Young Mark
 Summertime (1955) - Vito de Rossi
 Escapade (1955) - L. W. Daventry
 It's Great to Be Young (1956) - Nicky, The Angel Hill Kids
 The Prince and the Showgirl (1957) - King Nicolas
 Wonderful Things! (1958) - Mario
 Ferry to Hong Kong (1959) - Miguel Henriques, 1st Officer
 The Roman Spring of Mrs. Stone (1961) - Young man
 The Brain (1962) - Martin Holt
 King and Country (1964) - Private Sparrow
 Operation Crossbow  (1965) - SS Officer at Rocket Plant (uncredited)
 He Who Rides a Tiger (1965) - The Panda
 Fahrenheit 451 (1966) - Man with the Apple

References

Bibliography 
John Holmstrom, The Moving Picture Boy: An International Encyclopaedia from 1895 to 1995, Norwich, Michael Russell, 1996, p. 204.

External links
 
 Jeremy Spenser at Theatricalia.com

1937 births
Living people
English male stage actors
English male film actors
English male television actors
Male actors from London